Molpadiodemas is a genus of sea cucumbers belonging to the monotypic family Molpadiodemidae. The genus has an almost cosmopolitan distribution.

Species
The following species are recognised in the genus Molpadiodemas:
Molpadiodemas atlanticus (R.Perrier, 1898)
Molpadiodemas constrictus O'Loughlin & Ahearn, 2005
Molpadiodemas crinitus O'Loughlin & Ahearn, 2005
Molpadiodemas depressus (Hérouard, 1902)
Molpadiodemas epibiotus O'Loughlin & Ahearn, 2005
Molpadiodemas helios O'Loughlin & Ahearn, 2005
Molpadiodemas involutus (Sluiter, 1901)
Molpadiodemas morbillus O'Loughlin & Ahearn, 2005
Molpadiodemas neovillosus O'Loughlin & Ahearn, 2005
Molpadiodemas pediculus O'Loughlin & Ahearn, 2005
Molpadiodemas porphyrus O'Loughlin & Ahearn, 2005
Molpadiodemas pustulosus (Sluiter, 1901)
Molpadiodemas translucens O'Loughlin & Ahearn, 2005
Molpadiodemas ustulatus O'Loughlin & Ahearn, 2005
Molpadiodemas villosus (Théel, 1886)
Molpadiodemas violaceus (Théel, 1886)

References

Persiculida
Holothuroidea genera